Spruces, Picea species, are used as food plants by the caterpillars of many species of Lepidoptera. The Database of the World's Lepidopteran Hostplants (HOSTS) lists over 1,000 species of Lepidoptera (See External links).

A few examples are listed below:

 Batrachedridae
 Batrachedra pinicolella
 Crambidae
 Conogethes pinicolalis – recorded on Ezo spruce (P. jezoensis)
 Gelechiidae
Chionodes species:
 C. continuella – recorded on white spruce (P. glauca)
 C. electella
 Geometridae
 Bupalus piniaria (bordered white)
 Ectropis crepuscularia (engrailed)
 Epirrita autumnata (autumnal moth)
 Eupithecia subfuscata (grey pug) – recorded on black spruce (P. mariana)
 Odontopera bidentata (scalloped hazel) – recorded on Norway spruce (P. abies)
 Operophtera brumata (winter moth) – recorded on Norway spruce (P. abies)
 Hepialidae
 Gazoryctra wielgusi
 Korscheltellus gracilis (conifer swift) – prefers red spruce (P. rubens), also recorded on white spruce (P. glauca)
 Lymantriidae
 Lymantria dispar (gypsy moth) – older larvae only
 Noctuidae
 Agrotis segetum (turnip moth) – recorded on Sitka spruce (P. sitchensis)
 Panolis flammea (pine beauty)
 Tortricidae
 Cydia duplicana – recorded on injured bark of Norway spruce (P. abies)
 Cydia illutana – recorded on Norway spruce (P. abies) and Siberian spruce (P. (a.) obovata) cone scales
 Syndemis musculana

References

External links

Spruce
+Lepidoptera